Geer  is a hamlet in the Dutch province of Utrecht. It is a part of the municipality of Vijfheerenlanden, and lies about 9 km northeast of Gorinchem.

The hamlet was first mentioned in 1874 as Geer (De), and means "tapering piece of land". The postal authorities have placed it under Nieuwland. In 1840, it was home to 138 people.

References
 

Populated places in Utrecht (province)
Vijfheerenlanden